Garland "Jake" Stahl (April 13, 1879 – September 18, 1922) was an American first baseman and manager in Major League Baseball with the Boston Red Sox, Washington Senators, and New York Highlanders.

Biography

A graduate of the University of Illinois, he was a member of the Kappa Kappa chapter of Sigma Chi.

Stahl began his baseball career as a catcher with the Boston Americans in 1903, before being purchased by the Washington Senators, where he moved to first base full-time, with occasional stints in the outfield. He was purchased from the Senators by the Chicago White Sox in May 1907, although he did not play that year.  In October, the White Sox traded him to the New York Highlanders in a three-team trade, with Frank LaPorte going from the Highlanders to the Americans and Freddy Parent going from the Americans to the White Sox.  In July 1908, he was purchased from the Highlanders by the Boston Red Sox.  

He also struck out 128 times for the year, a record that would stand until 1938. As a player-manager, he led the Senators to two seventh-place finishes in 1905 and 1906.

Stahl sat out the 1911 season, instead opting to return to his native Illinois, where he took a position as a bank manager for a firm on the South side of Chicago.

Stahl was offered a position as player-manager of the Boston Red Sox for 1912 — a position which required the team and Stahl to obtain formal reinstatement by baseball's National Commission since Stahl had been previously deemed to be in violation of "rule 33" when he failed to report in 1911. This dispensation was given in January 1912, freeing Stahl to assume his place as player-manager of the Red Sox. The team did not elect to find him for his absence in 1911., and in his second managerial stint led the Red Sox to the 1912 World Series title. His success was short-lived, as he had a falling-out with his teammates and resigned midway through the  season. His successor, Bill Carrigan, would win two more World Series titles for the Sox. Stahl died of tuberculosis in Monrovia, California at age 43.

Stahl has a measure of immortality as the acknowledged eponym of the term "jaking it", a baseball phrase for faking an injury to stay out of the lineup, or otherwise loafing.

Stahl was not related to Red Sox teammate Chick Stahl, despite contemporary accounts erroneously listing them as brothers.

Managerial record

See also
 List of Major League Baseball annual home run leaders
 List of Major League Baseball career stolen bases leaders
List of Major League Baseball player-managers

References

External links

1879 births
1922 deaths
American football guards
American football tackles
Major League Baseball first basemen
Major League Baseball player-managers
Boston Americans players
Boston Red Sox managers
Boston Red Sox players
Illinois Fighting Illini baseball players
Illinois Fighting Illini football players
Indiana Hoosiers baseball coaches
New York Highlanders players
Washington Senators (1901–1960) players
Washington Senators (1901–1960) managers
American League home run champions
People from Elkhart, Illinois
Players of American football from Illinois
Baseball players from Illinois
20th-century deaths from tuberculosis
Tuberculosis deaths in California
St